Kynren - "an epic tale of England" is a live outdoor show, which takes place in the 11Arches Park on Flatts Farm in Bishop Auckland. The 90-minute performance depicts vital moments in British history and myth spanning 2000 years. This includes the Roman conquest of Britain, King Arthur's search for the Holy Grail, and Winston Churchill's "This was their finest hour" speech during WW2, and many more.

Kynren is run by 11Arches which is a charity based in Bishop Auckland. 11Arches is one of the two charities established in Bishop Auckland by Jonathan Ruffer, the other being The Auckland Project. Together, the aim of the charities is to establish Bishop Auckland as an international tourist destination, attracting visitors and investment which will contribute to the betterment of the area and empower the community. Kynren's cast and crew of 1000 are all volunteers and are all from the local area.

Plot 
Kynren is Narrated by Arthur, a fictional ten year old boy who travels back in time to witness pivotal moments in the history of the British Isles.The show does have a soft focus on the North East of England.

The opening scene echoes an event that really did take place in the 1880s, when a young cleric’s exuberant kick ultimately led to the Bishop banishing football in the Castle grounds. This prompted the birth of ‘The Blues’ – Bishop Auckland FC – the most successful amateur football club of all time. By passing through the Gatehouse of Time, the young Arthur is able to journey through history. The Gatehouse on the Kynren stage is a replica of the Robinson Arch which marks the formal entrance to the grounds of Auckland Castle. Arthur then travels through time exploring and seeing different important aspects of British History.

History 
11Arches is the vision of philanthropist Jonathan Ruffer and co-founder Anne-Isabelle Daulon, CEO of 11Arches. It is one of two charities established by Jonathan Ruffer in Bishop Auckland, the other being The Auckland Project. Together, they want to establish Bishop Auckland as a national and international tourist destination, acting as a catalyst for the regeneration of the area.

Established in 2014, 11Arches began operating on the 2 July 2016 when it presented the first season of Kynren, a sold out, open-air summer spectacular templated from the award-winning Cinéscénie produced by Puy du Fou in France. Kynren was created thanks to an initial £35m investment, funded entirely by charitable donations and has since operated on previous year’s proceeds. Kynren will now enter its 7th Season in the summer of 2022.

Due to the COVID-19 outbreak in 2020 Kynren was cancelled its season that year. During the cancelled season Johnathan Ruffer sponsored the costs to keep the site running and ready for the next season.

In 2021 11Arches Park was opened to the public featuring a new equestrian stunt show "Fina and The Golden Cape" as the main attraction and was a huge success. 11Arches Park also featured "The Maze Of Fame", Live Music, the Animal Croft, the "Dancing Waters" show and the "Viking Village". In 2022 11Arches decided not to open the Park and allow for more to be added before reopening as a day attraction.

Awards 
Kynren, 11Arches, and the volunteers have won various awards including:

 Queen's Award for Voluntary Service (2018)
 Innovation in Tourism Award (2018)
 Accessibility Award (2019)
 Green Tourism Award (2019)

11Arches Park 
In 2021, the 11Arches team opened 11Arches Park which showcases a number of outdoor attractions and smaller live-shows which run on show days, leading up to the main event.

The Park was originally planned to open in 2020, however the 2020 season and all shows was cancelled due to the coronavirus COVID-19 outbreak. Shows continued in 2021 and will open for the summer season 2022

The park opened with a maze/ library show, a Viking Village, an Animal Croft, live music, and a new children's playground.  11Arches Park also has a large food court, serving a variety of food types.

2021 also saw the introduction of the day-time show “Fina and The Golden Cape”, which was a primary attraction within the park. Audience members observed as a young woman named Fina fight to defend her village- with pyrotechnics, horse stunts and advanced combat routines filling the show on the 7.5 acre stage, also used for Kynren.

The Kynren website describes Fina and The Golden Cape as having “ jousting, trick-riding, vaulting and chariot-racing”, which are performed by highly trained Stunt riders.

References

Bishop Auckland
Festivals in County Durham